Aghacommon is a small village and townland in north County Armagh, Northern Ireland. It lies between Derrymacash (to the northwest), Lurgan (to the east) and Craigavon (to the south). The M1 motorway and Dublin–Belfast railway line are on either side. The village covers the townlands of Aghacommon and Ballynamony. The village is often confused with its better known neighbouring townland Derrymacash.

Aghacommon has a Catholic church and primary school, both named for Saint Patrick. At the southern edge of the village is Craigavon lakes and Tannaghmore Animal Farm. The animal farm, which is open to the public, holds rare and endangered farm animals that were once widespread in Ulster. There is a farming museum on the site.

Census 2011 Details
Aghacommon lies within the Derrytrasna electoral ward and Derrytrasna 1 "super output area". On Census Day, 2011, the resident population of Derrytrasna  was 2896. Of this population:

 93% - Roman Catholic
 2% - Protestant
 4% -  aged 75+
 61% - aged 18–75
 35% - aged 0–18
 42% - female
 58% - male
 28% - unemployed

References

Villages in County Armagh
Townlands of County Armagh